The kting voar, also known as the khting vor, linh dương, or snake-eating cow is a bovid mammal reputed to exist in Cambodia and Vietnam. The kting voar's existence as a real species should be regarded as questionable.

Characteristics 
It often has some sort of connection with snakes, varying between stories.

Names 
Kting voar is the animal's Cambodian name. This was erroneously translated in the West as 'jungle sheep', leading to a mistaken assumption that the animal was related to sheep and goats.

Adding to the confusion, the Vietnamese name linh dương meaning ('antelope') or ('gnu') was once reported to refer to this animal. However, this is in fact a local name of the mainland serow.

Other Kampuchean names possibly include kting sipuoh ('snake-eating cattle') and khting pôs. The Latinized binomial "Pseudonovibos spiralis" is invalid, given that the holotype for the species was identified as a domesticated cow. However, the name would mean c.f. 'fake new cattle' with 'spiral' horns.

Controversy 
For Western scientists, the first evidence supporting the kting voar's existence was a set of horns found by biologist Wolfgang Peter in a Ho Chi Minh City market (Peter & Feiler, 1994a). The horns were so unusual that Peter believed them to belong to a new species (Peter & Feiler, 1994b).

No anatomical information, except for horns and frontlets, is available, so the phylogenetic status of the kting voar has been uncertain. Peter & Feiler (1994a) proposed the relationships of P. spiralis with Antilopini, but morphological analyses by Dioli (1995, 1997) and Timm & Brandt (2001) suggest affinities within Bovini, while Nadler (1997) believed P. spiralis to be related to Caprini. Genetic studies using alleged kting voar specimens have produced confusing results (Hammer et al., 1999; Kuznetsov et al., 2001a,b, 2002). However, these results from DNA have been demonstrated to be cases of DNA contamination (Hassanin & Douzery, 2000; Hassanin, 2002; Olson & Hassanin, 2003).

All supposed kting voar specimens that were subject to DNA analysis to date have turned out to be artificially shaped cattle horns (Hassanin et al., 2001; Thomas, Seveau, and Hassanin, 2001; Hassanin, 2002). The most likely explanation, given the DNA testing results and the unusual spotted fur (which is well known in domesticated, but unknown in wild cattle), seem to be that modern specimens at least are cattle horns shaped by a complicated technique in order to serve as anti-snake talismans.

The vigorous controversy over the existence of P. spiralis has been covered in Nature (Whitfield, 2002), New York Times (Mydans, 2002), and Science (Malakoff, 2001).

There is also an earlier report of British tiger-hunters in the first part the 20th century, who observed kting voar and shot two as tiger bait.

Skeptical opinion is that the kting voar is a mythical animal. Cow horns are often sold as imitation kting voar horns in Kampuche markets. However, some scientists, notably American mammalogist Dr. Robert Timm, consider it probable that the root of the folklore is a real, distinct species of wild bovid (Brandt et al., 2001; Timm & Brandt, 2001). If so, this animal would be highly endangered or more probably recently extinct, because rampant hunting and deforestation decimated populations of other big mammals in the region.

More recently, Feiler et al. (2002) established that most of the horn sheaths of the kting voar, including the holotype were superficially embellished, but added that it remains to be seen whether these horns belong to cattle or a distinct species in its own right.

Until further evidence is obtained, the kting voar's existence as a real species should be regarded as questionable (Galbreath & Melville, 2003).

References

General references
 Dioli M., 1995. A clarification about the morphology of the horns of the female kouprey: a new unknown bovid species from Cambodia. Mammalia 59, 663–667.
 Dioli, M., 1997. Notes on the morphology of the horns of a new artiodactyl mammal from Cambodia: Pseudonovibos spiralis. J. Zool. (Lond.) 241: 527–531.
 Feiler, A., Ziegler, T., Ansorge, H. & Nadler, T. 2002. Pseudonovibos spiralis – Mythos oder Wirklichkeit? ZGAP Mitteilungen 18: 21–24.
 Galbreath, G. J. and Melville, R. A., 2003. Pseudonovibos spiralis: epitaph. J. Zool. (Lond.) 259: 169–170.
 Hammer, S.E., Suchentrunk, F., Tiedemann, R., Hartl, G.B., Feiler, A., 1999. Mitochondrial DNA sequence relationships of the newly described enigmatic Vietnamese bovid, Pseudonovibos spiralis. Naturwissenschaften 86, 279–280.
 Hassanin, A., 2002. Ancient specimens and DNA contamination: a case study from the 12S rRNA gene sequence of the ‘‘linh duong’’ bovid (Pseudonovibos spiralis). Naturwissenschaften 89, 107–110.
 Hassanin, A., Douzery, E., 2000. Is the newly described bovid, Pseudonovibos spiralis, a chamois (genus Rupicapra)? Naturwissenschaften 87, 122–124.
 Hassanin, A., Seveau, A., Thomas, H., Bocherens, H., Billiou, D. and Nguyen, B.X. 2001. Evidence from DNA that the mysterious 'linh duong' (Pseudonovibos spiralis) is not a new bovid. Comptes Rendus de l'Académie des Sciences Série III Sciences de la Vie 324: 71–80.
 Hoffmann R.S., 1986. A new locality record for the kouprey from Vietnam, and an archaeological record from China, Mammalia 50, 391–395.
 Kuznetsov, G.V., Kulikov, E.E., Petrov, N.B., Ivanova, N.V., Lomov, A.A., Kholodova, M.V., Poltaraus, A.B., 2001a. The ‘‘linh duong’’ Pseudonovibos spiralis (Mammalia, Artiodactyla) is a new buffalo. Naturwissenschaften 88, 123–125.
 Kuznetsov, G.V., Kulikov, E.E., Petrov, N.B., Ivanova, N.V., Lomov, A.A., Kholodova, M.V., Poltaraus, A.B., 2001b. Taxonomic status and phylogenetic relations of the new genus and species Pseudonovibos spiralis W.P. Peter, A. Feiler, 1994 (Artiodactyla, Bovidae). Zoologičeskij Žurnal (in Russian) 80 (11): 1395–1403.
 Kuznetsov, G.V., Kulikov, E.E., Petrov, N.B., Ivanova, N.V., Lomov, A.A., Kholodova, M.V., Poltaraus, A.B., 2002. Mitochondrial 12S rDNA sequence relationships suggest that the enigmatic bovid ‘‘linh duong’’ Pseudonovibos spiralis is closely related to buffalo. Mol. Phylogenet. Evol. 23 (1), 91–94.
 MacDonald, A. A. & Linxin N. Yang, 1997. Chinese sources suggest early knowledge of the "unknown" ungulate Pseudonovibos spiralis from Vietnam and Cambodia. Journal of Zoology 241: 523–526.
 Malakoff, D. (ed.), 2001. Horny dilemma (in ‘‘Random Samples’’). Science 291: 39.
 Mydans, S., 2002. Cambodia's mystery, the horns that never were. New York Times (May 6).
 Nadler, T., 1997. Was ist Pseudonovibos spiralis? Zool. Garten N.F. 67, 290–292.
 Olson, L. E. and Hassanin A., 2003. Contamination and chimerism are perpetuating the legend of the snake-eating cow with twisted horns (Pseudonovibos spiralis): A case study of the pitfalls of ancient DNA. Mol. Phylogenetics. Evol. 27 (2):545–548.
 Peter, W.P., Feiler, A., 1994a. Horns of an unknown bovid species from Vietnam (Mammalia: Ruminantia). Faun. Abh. Mus. Tierkd. Dresden 19, 247–253.
 Peter, W.P., Feiler, A., 1994b. A new bovid species from Vietnam and Cambodia (Mammalia: Ruminantia). Zool. Abh. Mus. Tierkd. Dresden 48, 169–176.
 Thomas, H., Seveau, A. and Hassanin, A. 2001. The enigmatic new Indochinese bovid, Pseudonovibos spiralis: an extraordinary forgery. Comptes Rendus de l'Académie des Sciences Série III Sciences de la Vie 324:81–86.
 Timm, R.M. & Brandt, J.H., 2001. Pseudonovibos spiralis (Artiodactyla: Bovidae): new information on this enigmatic South-east Asian ox. J. Zool., Lond. 253: 157–166.
 Whitfield, J., 2002. Locking horns. Nature 415: 956. doi:10.1038/415956a

Bovidae
Cambodian legendary creatures
Controversial mammal taxa
Purported mammals
Vietnamese legendary creatures